Norman Township is the name of some places in the U.S. state of Minnesota:
Norman Township, Pine County, Minnesota
Norman Township, Yellow Medicine County, Minnesota

See also

 Normania Township, Yellow Medicine County, Minnesota
 Normanna Township, St. Louis County, Minnesota
 Norman (disambiguation)

Minnesota township disambiguation pages